The 1. FC Haßfurt is a German association football club from the city of Haßfurt, Bavaria.

History
The club was formed in 1917 under its current name, 1. FC Haßfurt.

The 1. FC Haßfurt first appeared above the local football level in 1957, when it achieved promotion to the Amateurliga Bayern-Nord (III), the northern division of the highest state league. It could not manage to hold this level in its first season 1957–58 and was relegated straight back to the 2. Amateurliga Unterfranken.

Bouncing straight back in 1959, Haßfurt had a much better second try in the Amateurliga, coming sixth in 1959–60. A strong performance the season after saw the club winning its league and earning promotion to the 2. Oberliga Süd, then the second tier of league football in Southern Germany. While the club easily won its promotion round, unbeaten in six games versus Offenburger FV, TSV Heusenstamm and Salamander Kornwestheim, it could only obtain a licence for the second division on appeal.

In the same league with some well-known football clubs from the south of Germany, like Hessen Kassel, FSV Frankfurt and Stuttgarter Kickers, the team performed well, earning a tenth place in its first season. Its second year in the league was to be the last edition of the competition due to the formation of the Bundesliga. A fourteenth place was not enough for the 1. FC Haßfurt to earn a place in the new tier two Regionalliga Süd and it had to return to the now single-division Amateurliga Bayern.

Upon return to the third tier, the club continued to perform well, earning a third place in its first year. After a some mixed results, the team repeated this performance in 1968–69. From there, however, the club went downhill, resulting in relegation from the Amateurliga to the Landesliga Bayern-Nord (IV) in 1972. After three unimpressive seasons in this league, Haßfurt took out the title in 1975–76 and returned to the third division.

Settling in its first season, the second, 1977–78, proved to be a highlight in the club's history. Winning the division, one point ahead of MTV Ingolstadt, the 1. FC Haßfurt was directly promoted to the 2. Bundesliga Süd. Financial reasons however forced the club to not accept this offer and Ingolstadt found itself promoted instead. The club had one more outstanding season after this, in 1979–80, when it finished second in the league to FC Augsburg. The season after, it slipped to seventeenth place, and was relegated from what was now the Amateur-Oberliga Bayern.

The 1. FC Haßfurt did not manage to return to its successful past after this, fluctuating between the Landesliga Bayern-Nord and the league below, the Bezirksliga Unterfranken and later the Bezirksoberliga Unterfranken. The club found itself relegated from the Landesliga five times in the next two decades, in 1985, 1989, 1993, 1999 and 2005, only to return each time.

Having returned to the Landesliga in 2007, the club played in this league until 2009, when a 17th-place finish meant another relegation. The club continued its descend through the leagues, playing in the tier-eight Bezirksliga in 2011–12, where it suffered another relegation, now to the Kreisliga Schweinfurt.

Honours
The club's honours:

League
 Amateurliga Bayern (III)
 Champions: 1978
 Amateurliga Bayern-Nord (III)
 Champions: 1961
 2. Amateurliga Unterfranken West (IV)
 Champions: (2) 1954, 1957
 2. Amateurliga Unterfranken Ost (IV)
 Champions: 1959
 Landesliga Bayern-Nord (IV)
 Champions: 1976
 Bezirksoberliga Unterfranken (V-VI)
 Champions: 1990, 2001
 Runners-up: (2) 1996, 2007

Recent seasons
The recent season-by-season performance of the club:

With the introduction of the Bezirksoberligas in 1988 as the new fifth tier, below the Landesligas, all leagues below dropped one tier. With the introduction of the Regionalligas in 1994 and the 3. Liga in 2008 as the new third tier, below the 2. Bundesliga, all leagues below dropped one tier. With the establishment of the Regionalliga Bayern as the new fourth tier in Bavaria in 2012 the Bayernliga was split into a northern and a southern division, the number of Landesligas expanded from three to five and the Bezirksoberligas abolished. All leagues from the Bezirksligas onwards were elevated one tier.

DFB Cup appearances
The club has qualified for the first round of the German Cup only once:

Former players
 Ludwig Müller (1961–64), former German international (1968–69)
 Heinz-Herbert Kreh top-scorer in the Amateurliga Bayern-Nord (1960 – 36 goals), the 2, Oberliga Süd (1962 – 30 goals) and the Amateurliga Bayern (1965 – 38 goals and 1966 – 30 goals), also played 19 times for the German national amateur side

References

External links
Official team site
1. FC Haßfurt at Groundhopping.de  Report with pictures of the Stadium
1. FC Haßfurt at Fussballdaten.de
Das deutsche Fußball-Archiv historical German domestic league tables 
Manfreds Fussball Archiv Tables and results from the Bavarian amateur leagues

Football clubs in Germany
Football clubs in Bavaria
Association football clubs established in 1917
Football in Lower Franconia
1917 establishments in Germany